was a Kobayashi Shorin-ryu karate-do teacher known for his knowledge of karate history and generosity as a teacher. His primary teacher was Chosin Chibana, founder of Kobayashi Shorin-ryu; however, Nakama also studied with Chomo Hanashiro, Chōtoku Kyan, Kenwa Mabuni, Choki Motobu, and Kentsu Yabu. Nakama taught karate in Shuri, Okinawa, from c. 1935 to 1982.

In his popular book, "Okinawan Karate: Teachers, Styles, and Secret Techniques," Mark Bishop said, "More so than all the teachers I visited, Chozo Nakama seemed to express what is often termed 'the traditional Ryukyuan martial arts spirit.' His genuine humbleness and freedom from materialistic desire clearly reflected his spiritual development and deeply affected my understanding of the fighting arts."

1899 births
1982 deaths
Okinawan male karateka
Shōrin-ryū practitioners